The Education Amendments of 1972, also sometimes known as the Higher Education Amendments of 1972 (Public Law No. 92‑318, 86 Stat. 235), were U.S. legislation enacted on June 23, 1972. It is best known for its Title IX, which prohibited discrimination on the basis of sex in educational institutions receiving federal aid. It also modified government programs providing financial aid to students by directing money directly to students without the participation of intermediary financial institutions.

The Equal Pay Act of 1963 did not originally cover executives, administrators, outside salespeople, or professionals; the Education Amendments of 1972 amended the Fair Labor Standards Act to expand the coverage of the Equal Pay Act to these employees, by excluding the Equal Pay Act from the professional worker's exemption of the Fair Labor Standards Act.

Bibliography

References

External links
 Education Amendments of 1972 (PDF/details) as amended in the GPO Statute Compilations collection

1972 in law
92nd United States Congress
United States federal education legislation
1972 in education
 June 1972 events in the United States